Leftwich is a village in Cheshire, England.

Leftwich may also refer to:

Leftwich (surname)
USS Leftwich (DD-984), United States Navy Spruance-class destroyer
Leftwich House, historic house in Greenville, Ohio, United States